Samsung Contact was an enterprise email and groupware server that ran on Linux and HP-UX. It was based on HP OpenMail, which was licensed from Hewlett-Packard.

It provided email, calendars and other collaborative software, which are standard in groupware. It could be accessed from many different clients, most notably Microsoft Outlook.

Development began in November 2001. Following a major reorganization of its sponsor entity, Samsung SDS, most of the original core developers were laid off in 2003. Samsung Contact was discontinued at the end of 2007.

See also
HP OpenMail
Scalix

Contact